The 2008 Tour of California was the third edition of an eight-day, 650-mile (1,045 km) stage race, which began in Palo Alto (Stanford University), then raced through the California redwoods, wine country and the Pacific Coast and finished in Pasadena. The road bicycle racing event was held February 17–24. The 2008 Tour of California is part of the 2007–2008 UCI America Tour and the 2008 USA Cycling Professional Tour.

Participating teams 

UCI ProTour Teams
 AST - 
 BTL - 
 C.A - 
 CSC - 
 GST - 
 QST - 
 RAB - 
 SDV - 
 THR - 

UCI Professional Continental Teams
 BMC - 
 TSL - 

UCI Continental Teams
 BPC - 
 HNM - 
 JBC - 
 KBM - 
 RRC - 
 TUP -

Stage Results

Prologue, February 17, Palo Alto - Stanford University, 3.4 km

Stage 1, February 18, Sausalito - Santa Rosa, 156 km

Stage 2, February 19, Santa Rosa - Sacramento, 186 km

Stage 3, February 20, Modesto - San José, 165 km

Stage 4, February 21, Seaside - San Luis Obispo, 218 km

Stage 5, February 22, Solvang, 24 km

Stage 6, February 23, Santa Barbara - Santa Clarita, 169.6 km

Stage 7, February 24, Santa Clarita - Pasadena, 150 km

Final standing

General classification

Team classification

Young classification

Mountains classification

Sprint classification

Jersey progress

External links 

  - 2008 Tour Archive
 Live Coverage and Photos Cyclingfans.com

2008
Tour of California 2008
Tour of California 2008
Tour of California